The , 
It is owned and managed by East Nippon Expressway Company and Central Nippon Expressway Company.

Overview
The first section was opened in 1972 by Japan Highway Public Corporation and construction proceeded in stages until the entire route was completed in 1988. On October 1, 2005, all national expressways were privatized and management of the Hokuriku Expressway was divided between the East and Central Nippon Expressway Companies.

The route serves the Hokuriku region on the north central coast of Honshū, Japan's largest island. For most of its length it parallels National Route 8 and the Hokuriku Main Line of West Japan Railway Company.

Although the route officially originates in Niigata and terminates at Maibara, exit numbers and kilometer markings originate from Maibara.

Features
Around Tsuruga Interchange, the south-bound lanes cross over the north-bound lanes and diverges drastically. The expressway rejoins normally at a point near Suizu Parking Area.

There are 14 tunnels between Kinomoto Interchange and Takefu Interchange (two of which are longer than 2,000 m), and 26 tunnels between Asahi Interchange and Jōetsu Interchange (eight of which are longer than 2,000 m).

List of interchanges and features

 IC - interchange, SIC - smart interchange, JCT - junction, SA - service area, PA - parking area, BS - bus stop, TN - tunnel, CB - snow chains

References

External links 

East Nippon Expressway Company
Central Nippon Expressway Company

Expressways in Japan
Roads in Fukui Prefecture
Roads in Ishikawa Prefecture
Roads in Niigata Prefecture
Roads in Shiga Prefecture
Roads in Toyama Prefecture